The 2008 Commonwealth Bank Tennis Classic was a women's tennis tournament played on outdoor hard courts. It was the 14th edition of the Commonwealth Bank Tennis Classic, and was part of the Tier III Series of the 2008 WTA Tour. It took place at the Grand Hyatt Bali in Bali, Indonesia, from 8 September through 14 September 2008. Second-seeded Patty Schnyder won the singles title.

Finals

Singles

 Patty Schnyder defeated  Tamira Paszek, 6–3, 6–0
 It was Schnyder's 1st singles title of the year, and the 11th and last of her career.

Doubles

 Hsieh Su-wei  /  Peng Shuai  defeated  Marta Domachowska /   Nadia Petrova, 6–7(4–7), 7–6(7–3), [10–7]

External links
 Official website
 WTA tournament draws

Commonwealth Bank Tennis Classic
2008
2008 in Indonesian tennis